Lyle Thompson (born September 9, 1992) is an Iroquois professional lacrosse player at the attack position for the Cannons Lacrosse Club of the Premier Lacrosse League and the Georgia Swarm of the National Lacrosse League. He shared the 2014 men's Tewaaraton Trophy with his brother Miles while winning it again in 2015 alone. He is the only player in history to win the award twice consecutively.

Early life
Lyle grew up in the Onondaga Nation, NY, one of the five children of Doloris and Jerome Thompson. He began playing lacrosse from a very early age as lacrosse carries spiritual and cultural significance with the Onondaga nation. He attended LaFayette High School for his Sophomore and Junior years and Salmon River High School where he was an All-American and scored 66 goals and 54 assists in his senior season.

College
Lyle attended college at the University at Albany, majoring in sociology, although he initially pursued an art major as he has a passion for drawing. He was recruited to play for the school's Division I lacrosse team under head coach Scott Marr. Initially, he started at midfield in his freshman season in 2012, scoring 22 goals and 16 assists along with 32 face-off draws. That was his last collegiate season scoring less than 100 points. Moving to attack in his sophomore year, Thompson had 113 points in 2013, 128 in 2014, and 121 in 2015. Lyle, along with his brother Miles were the first Native American players to win the Tewaaraton Trophy; tewaaraton being the Mohawk term for the precursor of modern lacrosse.

Major League Lacrosse 
Lyle Thompson was drafted as the top overall pick in the 2015 Collegiate Draft by the Florida Launch; his brother Miles was drafted by the Launch the previous year. Lyle's first game was played against the Ohio Machine, and he played a total of eight games for the Launch during the 2015 season. He had 22 goals and 16 assists in his first season in Major League Lacrosse. On March 3, 2017, Lyle Thompson and his brother Jeremy Thompson were traded from the Florida Launch to the Chesapeake Bayhawks. In 2018 Lyle appeared in 6 games for the Bayhawks netting 20 goals, 1-2pt goal, 8 assists, and 17 ground balls.

Premier Lacrosse League 

Lyle Thompson is an attackman on the Cannons team of the Premier Lacrosse League.

National Lacrosse League 
On September 28, 2015, Lyle was drafted first overall in the 2015 NLL draft by the Georgia Swarm. Lyle played alongside his brother Miles on the Swarm. In 2017, Thompson was named both league MVP and Championship MVP as the Swarm won their first NLL title.

Heading into the 2023 NLL season, Inside Lacrosse ranked Thompson the #4 best forward in the NLL.

International competition 
As a player for the Iroquois men's national lacrosse team in the 2014 World Lacrosse Championship, Lyle helped the Iroquois Nationals place third, their best-ever result in international field lacrosse competition.

Lyle played for the Iroquois national indoor lacrosse team at the 2015 World Indoor Lacrosse Championship. The Iroquois won the silver medal, falling to Canada in the final match on September 27, 2015.

Lyle again played for the Iroquois in the 2018 World Lacrosse Championship in Israel. They placed 3rd.

College statistics

(a) 1st in NCAA Division I single season points
(b) 1st in career assists
(c) 1st in NCAA Division I career points

NLL career statistics

MLL career statistics

PLL statistics

Awards

See also
2014 NCAA Division I Men's Lacrosse Championship
Albany Great Danes men's lacrosse
NCAA Lacrosse Records

References

External links 
 New York Times profile
 Baltimore Sun, "Albany's Lyle Thompson has become the face of college lacrosse"
 Lacrosse Magazine interview with Lyle Thompson
 https://thompsonbrotherslacrosse.us/

1992 births
Living people
Iroquois nations lacrosse players
Native American sportspeople
Albany Great Danes men's lacrosse players
National Lacrosse League major award winners
Georgia Swarm players
Onondaga people
People from Onondaga County, New York
Premier Lacrosse League players
Florida Launch players
Chesapeake Bayhawks players
Lacrosse forwards
University at Albany, SUNY alumni